Santanu Bhattacharya (born 1958) is an Indian bioorganic chemist and a professor at the Indian Institute of Science. He is known for his studies of unnatural amino acids, oligopeptides and biologically active natural products and is an elected fellow of the Indian National Science Academy The World Academy of Sciences and the Indian Academy of Sciences The Council of Scientific and Industrial Research, the apex agency of the Government of India for scientific research, awarded him the Shanti Swarup Bhatnagar Prize for Science and Technology, one of the highest Indian science awards, in 2003, for his contributions to chemical sciences. He is also a recipient of the National Bioscience Award for Career Development of the Department of Biotechnology (2002) and the TWAS Prize (2010).

Biography 

Santanu Bhattacharya, born on 23 April 1958 in the Indian state of West Bengal, graduated in chemistry (B.Sc. Honors) from Calcutta University and continued at the university to complete his master's degree from Rajabazar Science College campus of University of Calcutta. Moving to the US, he enrolled for his doctoral studies on bioorganic chemistry at the laboratory of Robert A. Moss of the Rutgers University – New Brunswick and after securing a PhD in 1988, he did his post-doctoral studies with Har Gobind Khorana, a Nobel laureate at the Massachusetts Institute of Technology; the theme of his studies being signal transduction of membrane proteins. On his return to India, he joined the Indian Institute of Science where he served as an assistant professor (1991–96), associate professor (1996–2001) and a professor (since 2001); he continues at IISc as the chair of the department of organic chemistry. He also serves as an honorary professor of Jawaharlal Nehru Centre for Advanced Scientific Research at their chemical biology unit. He also served as the director of the oldest research institute of Asia, the Indian Association for the Cultivation of Science(IACS).

Legacy 
Focusing his researches on the interfaces of chemistry and biology, Bhattacharya is reported to have made notable contributions in the design and synthesis of unnatural amino acids, cyclic peptides, DNA binding small molecules, and other biologically active natural products. He has carried out several projects which include lipid molecular design and biophysics, peptide designs, structural studies of micelles, DNA binding anti-cancer agents, and design and synthesis of nanomaterials. He has published his researches by way of several peer-reviewed articles; the online repository of the Indian Academy of Sciences has listed 117 of them. On the academic administration front, he established a laboratory for bio-organic and supramolecular studies at Indian Institute of Science. He has supervised the post-graduate, doctoral and post-doctoral studies of several scholars and has sat in the editorial boards of journals such as Bioconjugate Chemistry and Langmuir of American Chemical Society, and the Journal of Materials Nanoscience.

Awards and honors 
Bhattacharya received the B. M. Birla Science Award in 1997 and the Material Research Society of India Medal two years later. The National Bioscience Award for Career Development of the Department of Biotechnology reached him in 2002 and the Council of Scientific and Industrial Research awarded him in 2003 with the Shanti Swarup Bhatnagar Prize, one of the highest Indian science awards. He was selected for the TWAS Prize in 2010 and the Ranbaxy Research Award in 2013. P. U. Bhagyatara National Award (2004), CDRI Award of the Central Drug Research Institute (2004) and the G. D. Birla Award (2007) are some of the other notable awards he has received. Holder of J. C. Bose National Fellowship in 2008 and Swarna Jayanthi Fellowship of the Department of Science and Technology during 1998–2003, he was elected as a fellow by the Indian Academy of Sciences in 2000 and he became an elected fellow of the Indian National Science Academy in 2007 and The World Academy of Sciences in 2012. He has also delivered several award orations including the D. Ranganathan Memorial Lecture of the Chemical Research Society of India (2007) and the Nitya Anand Endowment Lecture of the Indian National Science Academy (2007).

See also 

 Indian Association for the Cultivation of Science(IACS)

 Amino acids
 Cyclic peptides
 Har Gobind Khorana
I

References 

Recipients of the Shanti Swarup Bhatnagar Award in Chemical Science
1957 births
Indian scientific authors
Fellows of the Indian Academy of Sciences
Fellows of the Indian National Science Academy
Living people
Scientists from West Bengal
Indian organic chemists
N-BIOS Prize recipients
TWAS fellows
University of Calcutta alumni
Massachusetts Institute of Technology alumni
Rutgers University alumni
Academic staff of the Indian Institute of Science
TWAS laureates